RKV may refer to:

 The IATA code for Reykjavík Airport
 The Amtrak code for Rockville station, Maryland, US
 Call sign for USNS Rose Knot (T-AGM-14)
 Rahul Vaidya, Indian singer